The pajama cardinalfish, spotted cardinalfish, coral cardinalfish, or polkadot cardinalfish (Sphaeramia nematoptera) is a species of fish belonging to the family Apogonidae. It is a popular aquarium fish. It is considered to be of low vulnerability, and is distributed throughout much of the western Pacific Ocean, from Java to Fiji,  and from the Ryukyu Islands south to the Great Barrier Reef. The male pajama cardinalfish incubates the eggs in his mouth until they hatch.

Pajama cardinalfish display a rainbow of colors. They have greenish-yellow faces, bright orange eyes, and  silver-based bodies dressed with a bold black scalar margin and  posteriors dotted with orange polka  dots. Though their bold coloration may stand out, S. nematoptera fish have a peaceful nature that lets them blend perfectly into most community saltwater aquaria.

Like many other schooling fish, pajama cardinalfish form a strict hierarchy when kept in small groups within the aquarium. However, unlike some social fish, this member of the family Apogonidae does not use aggression to exert dominance over other cardinalfish.

References

External links
 

nemoptera
Fish of Southeast Asia
Fish of Indonesia
Taxa named by Pieter Bleeker 
Fish described in 1856